James Dobbin is the name of:

 Jim Dobbin (1941–2014), British Labour Party Member of Parliament
 James C. Dobbin (1814–1857), American Congressman and Secretary of the Navy
 Jim Dobbin (footballer) (born 1963), Scottish former professional football player
 Jim Dobbin (Canadian football) (born 1920s), Canadian football player

See also 
 James Dobbins (disambiguation)